The 2002–03 Druga HNL (also known as 2. HNL) season was the 12th season of Croatia's second level football since its establishment in 1992. The league was contested in two regional groups (North Division and South Division), with 12 clubs each.

North Division

First stage

Play-off Group

Play-out Group

South Division

First stage

Play-off Group

Play-out Group

Promotion play-off

Marsonia and Inker Zaprešić, winners of the North and South Division, qualified for a two-legged promotion play-off, which took place on 28 May and 1 June 2003. The tie ended in a 4–4 aggregate score and Marsonia won it on away goals, thereby earning promotion to the Prva HNL for the following season.

However, Inker had another chance for promotion, as the losing team from the promotion play-off played another two-legged tie against the 11th placed team of Prva HNL, Pomorac. Inker won 3–1 on aggregate and was promoted to 2003–04 Prva HNL.

See also
2002–03 Prva HNL
2002–03 Croatian Cup

External links
2002–03 in Croatian Football at Rec.Sport.Soccer Statistics Foundation
Official website  

First Football League (Croatia) seasons
Cro
Drug